Hill Arches is a bronze sculpture by Henry Moore, catalogued as LH 636.

Description
The piece is made of four separate parts, three of which are described by Roger Berthoud, Moore's biographer, as being stirrup-shaped; the fourth is a large sphere.

Casts
One cast is situated in the Karlsplatz in front of the Karlskirche in Vienna, where it was installed in 1978 – initially to complaints that it disrupted the views of the historic church. Another is sited at the headquarters of Deere and Company in Illinois.

References

External links 

1973 sculptures
Bronze sculptures in Austria
Outdoor sculptures in Austria
Sculptures by Henry Moore